The Uproar Festival, also called the Rockstar Energy Drink Uproar Festival, was an annual hard rock and heavy metal tour inaugurated in 2010 by John Reese and sponsored by Rockstar Energy Drink. The tour was also created by John Oakes, Darryl Eaton and Ryan Harlacher from the Creative Artists Agency, and Perry Lavoisne from Live Nation. Reese is also responsible for creating Mayhem Festival and the Taste of Chaos tour. Uproar Festival is the replacement for Reese's Taste of Chaos tour, as he was "running out of bands that fit within the profile of what Taste of Chaos was."

Reese attempted to have Pantera as headliner for a 2015 show, but those plans fell through. The 2014 festival was the last.

2010 line-up
Main Stage
Disturbed 
Avenged Sevenfold
Stone Sour
Halestorm

Jägermeister Stage
Hellyeah 
Airbourne
Hail the Villain
New Medicine
White Cowbell Oklahoma (for all Canadian dates)
Jägermeister Battle of the Bands Winner

2010 tour dates

2011 line-up

Main Stage
Avenged Sevenfold 
Three Days Grace
Seether
Bullet for My Valentine
Escape the Fate

Best Buy Music Gear Stage
Sevendust 
Black Tide
Art of Dying
Hell or Highwater
Fozzy (Selected Dates)
Battle of the Bands Winner

2011 tour dates

2012 line-up
Main Stage
Shinedown 
Godsmack
Staind
Papa Roach (cancelled after first five dates due to Jacoby Shaddix vocal chords problems, Rock the Rapids show was also cancelled)
Adelitas Way

Ernie Ball Stage
P.O.D. (except 8/25, replaced Papa Roach on the main stage on the Rock the Rapids show)
Fozzy (except 8/19, 8/29 and 9/18)
Mindset Evolution
Candlelight Red

Jägermeister Stage
Deuce
Redlight King (except 9/1 and 9/18)
In This Moment (until 9/2)
Thousand Foot Krutch (started 9/7, except 9/8, 9/15. 9/29 and 9/30)
Greek Fire (select dates only: 8/17, 8/18, 8/19, 8/22, 8/24)
Switchpin (select dates only: 8/17, 8/18, 8/19, 8/22, 8/24, 8/25, 8/26, 8/28)
Cruz (select dates only: 8/19, 8/25, 8/26, 8/28, 8/31, 9/1, 9/2, 9/7)
Silvertung (select dates only: 8/31, 9/1, 9/2)
Uncrowned (select dates only: 9/7, 9/8, 9/9, 9/11, 9/12, 9/13, 9/16, 9/19, 9/29, 9/30)
Within Reason (select dates only: 9/8, 9/9, 9/11, 9/12, 9/13, 9/16)
Attika 7 (select dates only: 9/19, 9/21, 9/22, 9/23, 9/25, 9/29, 9/30)
Drown Mary (select dates only: 9/21, 9/22, 9/23)

2012 tour dates

2013 line-up 

Main Stage
Alice in Chains 
Jane's Addiction
Coheed and Cambria
Circa Survive

Festival Stage
Walking Papers
Danko Jones
Middle Class Rut
New Politics
The Chuck Shaffer Picture Show

COLDCOCK Spirits Showcase Stage
The Dead Daisies
Beware of Darkness
Charming Liars

2013 tour dates

 This show was part of KISW 99.9's Pain In The Grass *

2014 line-up 

Main Stage
Godsmack 
Seether
Skillet
Buckcherry

Blackstream Stage
Pop Evil
Escape the Fate
Redlight King
These Raven Skies
Tattered
Sons of Revelry
3 Years Hollow
Within Reason
New Medicine
The Reality Of Yourself (T.R.O.Y)

2014 tour dates

References

External links

Rockstar Uproar Irvine Review and Pictures

Heavy metal festivals in Canada
Heavy metal festivals in the United States
2010 concert tours
2011 concert tours
2012 concert tours
2013 concert tours
2014 concert tours

pt:Mayhem Festival